The Provincial Rights Party was a Canadian political party founded and led by Frederick W. A. G. Haultain in 1905 to contest elections in the new province of Saskatchewan. It was the successor to the eastern branch of the Northwest Territories Conservative Party.
Haultain had been Premier of the North-West Territories prior to the province's creation. He hoped to lead a government in the place of the Saskatchewan Liberal Party, which was backed by the federal government of Wilfrid Laurier. In the 1905 election, the Provincial Rights Party won nine seats and 47% of the vote, and the Liberals won 16 seats and 52% of the vote.

In the 1908 election, to an expanded 41 seat legislature, the Provincial Rights Party won 14 seats with 47% of the vote, losing again to the Liberals.

Haultain was appointed to the Saskatchewan Court of Appeal by Prime Minister Robert Borden in 1912, and the Provincial Rights Party became the Saskatchewan Conservative Party.

The Provincial Rights Party advocated greater provincial control over land, resources and development, and saw the Liberal Party as being too close to the Laurier federal government.

See also
Conservative Party of Saskatchewan
Canadian political parties

Provincial political parties in Saskatchewan